Alhamdulillah is an Arabic phrase meaning "praise be to God", sometimes translated as "thank God". This phrase is called Tahmid. A longer variant of the phrase is al-ḥamdu l-illāhi rabbi l-ʿālamīn, meaning "all praise is due to God, Lord of all the worlds", first verse of Surah Al-Fatiha.

The phrase is frequently used by Muslims of every background due to its centrality in the texts of the Quran and Hadith, the words of the Islamic prophet Muhammad. Its meaning and in-depth explanation have been the subject of much exegesis. It is also commonly used by non-Muslim speakers of the Arabic language.

Meaning

The phrase has three basic parts:
al-, the definite article, "the".
ḥamd(u), literally meaning "praise", "commendation".
li-llāh(i), preposition + noun Allāh. Li- is a dative preposition meaning "to". The word Allāh means "The God", and it is a contraction of the definite article al- and the word ʾilāh ("god, deity"). As in English, the article is used here to single out the noun as being the only one of its kind, "the God" (the one and only) or "God". Therefore, Allāh is the Arabic word for "God". ʾilāh is the Arabic cognate of the ancient Semitic name for God, El.

The phrase is first found in the second verse of the first sura of the Qur'an (Al-Fatiha). So frequently do Muslims and Arabic-speaking Jews and Christians invoke this phrase that the quadriliteral verb hamdala, "to say al-ḥamdu li-llāh" was coined, and the derived noun ḥamdala is used as a name for this phrase.

The triconsonantal root Ḥ-M-D, meaning "praise", can also be found in the names Muhammad, Mahmud, Hamid and Ahmad, among others.

Translation

English translations of alhamdulillah include: 
 "all praise is due to God alone"  (Muhammad Asad)
 "all the praises and thanks be to God" (Muhammad Muhsin Khan)
 "praise be to God" (Abdullah Yusuf Ali, Marmaduke Pickthall)
 "all praise is due to God" (Saheeh International)
“All perfect praises belong to the Almighty alone.” (A. R. Rahman)

Variants
Various Islamic phrases include the Tahmid, most commonly:

Use in other historical sources
Jabir bin `Abdullah (ra) narrated that :

the Messenger of God (ﷺ) said: “The best remembrance is: ‘there is none worthy of worship except Allah (Lā ilāha illallāh)’ and the best supplication is: ‘All praise is due to Allah (Al-ḥamdulillāh).’”

[At-Tirmidhi]. 

Abu Hurairah reported:

The Messenger of Allah (ﷺ) said, "Any matter of importance which is not begun with Al-hamdu lillah (praise be to Allah) remains defective."

[Abu Dawud].

Anas bin Malik  ؓ reported:

The Messenger of Allah (ﷺ) said, "Allah is pleased with His slave who says: 'Al-hamdu lillah (praise be to Allah)' when he takes a morsel of food and drinks a draught of water."

[Muslim].

See also

Tasbih
Tahlil
Takbir
Tasmiyah
Salawat
Peace be upon him
Shahadah
Glossary of Islam
Hadha min fadli Rabbi
Hosanna
Hallelujah

References

External links
AlHamdulillah - Detailed Explanation from Tafseer Ibn Katheer - Surah Fatiha
Health benefits of saying Alhamdulillah
Everyday duas in Arabic with transliteration and translation
Alhamdulillah-Commentary

Arab Muslims
Arab Christians
Arabic words and phrases
Arab-Jewish culture
Islamic terminology
Gratitude